Percassi is an Italian surname. Notable people with the surname include:

Antonio Percassi (born 1953), Italian footballer and businessman
Luca Percassi (born 1980), Italian footballer, son of Antonio

Italian-language surnames